Łukasz Teodorczyk (born 3 June 1991) is a Polish former professional footballer who played as a striker.

Club career

Early career
Having joined Polonia Warsaw in January 2010, Teodorczyk made his Ekstraklasa debut on 29 October 2010. During the 2010–11 season, his first at Polonia, he featured in six outings for the senior team, and appeared in 21 games in the Młoda Ekstraklasa youth league, scoring 15 goals.

Lech Poznań
Before leaving Lech Poznań in August 2014, Teodorczyk had played four games and scored three goals, which qualified him for a medal when Lech won the Ekstraklasa in May 2015.

Dynamo Kyiv

On 27 August 2014, Teodorczyk signed a five-year contract with Ukrainian club Dynamo Kyiv who reportedly paid €4 million for the transfer. He made his debut for Dynamo on 30 August 2014 in a 2–0 win against Chornomorets Odesa coming on as a substitute on the 85th minute. About 15 seconds after he came on he made an assist for 2–0. On 13 September 2014, he scored his first goal for Dynamo in a 2–2 draw against Zorya Luhansk. In his first season with Dynamo he won the first league of his career, helping his team win the double of Ukrainian Premier League and the Ukrainian Cup. In the league he scored 5 goals in 13 appearances. He missed out on the cup final having sustained an injury during the semi-final match against Olimpik Donetsk which kept him out for 2 months. On international level, he reached the quarter finals of the Europa League with Dynamo where the club was knocked out by Fiorentina 1–3 on aggregate. In the 6 matches he played in the Europa League he scored 3 goals against the likes of Steaua București, EA Guingamp and Everton.

On 24 November 2015, Teodorczyk made his UEFA Champions League debut on matchday 5 of the group stage in a 2–0 away win against Portuguese club FC Porto, coming on as a substitute on the 87th minute. While he remained goalless in the competition, Dynamo reached the last sixteen of the UEFA Champions League that season before being eliminated by Manchester City 1–3 on aggregate. In the league he scored 5 goals in 11 matches in the 2015–16 season.

Anderlecht (loan)
On 4 August 2016, Teodorczyk was loaned out to Belgian club R.S.C. Anderlecht for the season. He made his debut for Anderlecht on 7 August 2016 in a 5–0 win against Kortrijk and scored his first goal for the club that same day.

Anderlecht
On 30 March 2017, Teodorczyk signed a permanent contract with Anderlecht until 2020. Anderlecht paid a previously-agreed €4.5 million transfer fee to Dynamo Kyiv. He won the top scorer for the season 2016–17 Belgian First Division A with 22 goals.

Udinese
On 17 August 2018, Teodorczyk signed a permanent contract with Udinese. On 29 December 2021, after making no appearances during the 2021–22 season, his contract was terminated by mutual consent.

Loan to Charleroi
On 5 October 2020, he joined Belgian club Charleroi on loan.

Vicenza
On 4 January 2022, he signed with Italian Serie B club Vicenza until the end of the 2021–22 season, with an option to extend. He left the team following the season's conclusion.

Retirement
On 19 November 2022, Teodorczyk announced his retirement from football on Instagram.

International career
After playing for the Poland national under-20 football team, Teodorczyk went on to feature for the U21 team and scored two goals in Poland's first qualification game for the European U21 Football Championship. He scored his first goals for the senior team on 2 February 2013, netting a brace in a 4–1 friendly win against Romania.

In May 2018 he was named in Poland's preliminary 35-man squad for the 2018 FIFA World Cup in Russia.

Career statistics

Club

International

International goals
Scores and results list Łukasz's goal tally first.

Honours
Lech Poznań
 Ekstraklasa: 2014–15

Dynamo Kyiv
 Ukrainian Premier League: 2014–15, 2015–16
 Ukrainian Cup: 2014–15
 Ukrainian Super Cup: 2016

Anderlecht
 Belgian First Division A: 2016–17
 Belgian Super Cup: 2017

Individual
 Belgian First Division A top goalscorer: 2016–17

References

External links

 

1991 births
Living people
People from Żuromin County
Polish footballers
Poland under-21 international footballers
Poland international footballers
Ekstraklasa players
Ukrainian Premier League players
Belgian Pro League players
Serie A players
Serie B players
Polonia Warsaw players
Lech Poznań players
FC Dynamo Kyiv players
R.S.C. Anderlecht players
Udinese Calcio players
R. Charleroi S.C. players
L.R. Vicenza players
Sportspeople from Masovian Voivodeship
Expatriate footballers in Ukraine
Polish expatriate footballers
Polish expatriate sportspeople in Ukraine
Expatriate footballers in Belgium
Polish expatriate sportspeople in Belgium
Expatriate footballers in Italy
Polish expatriate sportspeople in Italy
2018 FIFA World Cup players
Association football forwards